R. nivalis may refer to:
 Ranunculus nivalis, a flowering plant species
 Rubus nivalis, a raspberry species
 Rumex nivalis, a herb species